Michealene Cristini Risley is a best selling Author, writer, director and human rights activist. She ran for the Americans Elect nomination for President of the United States in 2012.

Background
Risley was born and raised in Clawson, Michigan, before spending her teenage years in Troy, Michigan.  She graduated from Bishop Foley High School and went on to graduate from Michigan State University with a degree in Telecommunications and minors in English and Advertising.  She spent a number of years in Hollywood for such companies as Disney, Amblin and Mattel. While Vice President of Production for Marvel's animation unit she was recruited by SEGA of America to build a consumer products and entertainment division. At that time, SEGA was at less than 4% market share. The Consumer Products division was an incredible team that turned Sonic the Hedgehog until a billion dollar consumer products brand. She also pitched the executive team on the lost opportunity of creating games for girls, built the SEGA TASK force to address these issues. female market share at that time was 3% in 1993, when Risley departed in 1995 it had grown to 20%. The team also worked with two top animation facilities and created two Sonic animated series simultaneously. Both shows, the Network series and the syndication series were #1 hits. Creating two simultaneous hit shows on the same character at the same time, has not been done since. Michealene left SEGA to start her own for profit and not for profit company. She has continued to work with top athletes and sports companies after SEGA SPORTS and was hired by Nike to entertain building a gaming division for Nike or licensing out their roster of athletes to the video game sector. She recommended to Nike that they stick to their core business and license out those characters. Within her new company, Fresh Water Spigot, she took Nike's athletes out to the technology sector for licensing. This included Ronaldo, Brazil Soccer and Tiger Woods. The Tiger Woods/ Electronic Arts deal was the largest deal in the history of the video game sector at that time. As a serial entrepreneur the company that changed the direction of the industry was Adidas Maternity. This was the first branded maternity line ever in the marketplace.

Career
Risley's non profit was established as Freshwater Haven. The focus of that non profit was to use medial to create social change. Within this non profit, Risley is noted for her work as the writer, producer and director for the film Tapestries of Hope, which follows social activist Betty Makoni in her efforts to help sexually abused young women in Zimbabwe through her foundation the Girl Child Network.  Risley was imprisoned and then deported to South Africa by the Zimbabwean government for the footage she shot during her time with Makoni and the Girl Child Network.
 After being safely returned to the United States, Risley became a large part of the push for the passing of the International Violence Against Women Act by creating grassroots efforts with over 45 other human rights groups.  The film premiered in September 2010 in over 105 theaters nationwide.

In 2000, Risley was appointed as the VP of Production, Development and Consumer products for Marvel Comics. 
In 2003, she founded Fresh Water Haven, a 501(c)(3) organization that writes, produces, develops and brings to market films, documentaries and books with the goal of raising awareness about global issues that are in need of reform.  A frequent Huffington Post editorial writer, Risley is a noted Human Rights Speaker.  In 2003, Risley wrote, directed and produced Flashcards, a short film on child sexual abuse which won numerous awards and aired on PBS nationwide.  Risley co-authored the best-selling book This Is Not the Life I Ordered, alongside Deborah Collins Stephens, Jan Yanehiro, and Jackie Speier, which has sold over 50,000 copies (the book details the friendship of these four women and the ups and downs they faced in their lives). After Running Marvels animation unit Michealene was recruited by Sega of America to build a licensing and Entertainment division from scratch. As Senior Director of Entertainment/Consumer Products at SEGA of America, she recruited and built a small group in Beverly Hills, California and eventually moved the whole team up to Sega headquarters in Northern California---where she became fascinated with the tech world and has never left Silicon Valley. In 2006, Risley founded Fresh Water Spigot, a licensing and creative services agency specializing in consumer products categories; she also conceived, developed, and launched the first Adidas-branded maternity product line, The Power of Two, LLC.
Michealene was also Vice President of Games at Zynga, a San Francisco-based mobile games company.  She has been a CEO of a number of tech start-ups in entertainment sector. In 2019 a revised version of "This is not the life I ordered: was released. Michealene is currently creating a new television series and involved with consulting.  She spent most of 2020 working on delivery of PPE product in the United States to alleviate the spread of COVID-19.

Activism
As an passionate activist on issues of rape, abuse and human trafficking. Miss Risley has been thrown in prison in Zimbabwe, received death attempts and in 2019 while writing a version of the Larry Nassar story for television and hosting a Human trafficking event through Operation Big Sister, her LYFT vehicle was hijacked by one of the 346 gangs that do human trafficking.  She had to flee the area and recover from PTSD. She is no longer working at the grass roots level on these issues.

Community organizing and special events
A community organizer for years including Delegation 2010, the 60 plus non-profit groups she organized to push Congress to resign and fund IVAWA and three presidential campaigns including her own. Special events include:  Gentry Magazine fundraiser for 3 years that benefited her non profit, DUCKTALES in NY, Mattel Toy Fair and more.

Awards 
 2020 - Continental Who's Who List 
2017 - Top Writer Quora
 2010 – Silicon Valley Women of Influence award
 2010 – Monaco Film Festival – Special Mention for Inspiration and Strong Message
 2009 – Directors Finder Series – The Directors Guild of America
 2009 – Best Documentary – WIFTS (The Women in Film & Television Symposium)
 2009 – Best Director – WIFTS
 2009 – Aloha Accolade Award – Honolulu International Film Festival
 2009 – Award of Merit – Accolade Film Awards
 2009 – Best Documentary – Louisville International Festival of Film
 2009 – Award of Excellence – The Indie Fest
 2007 – New Communications Review "Award of Excellence" for live blogs during her filming and incarceration in Zimbabwe

References

External links
 Michealene2012 official 2012 presidential campaign site

Living people
American documentary filmmakers
American human rights activists
Women human rights activists
American women writers
Female candidates for President of the United States
Michigan State University alumni
Candidates in the 2012 United States presidential election
21st-century American politicians
21st-century American women politicians
People from Clawson, Michigan
People from Troy, Michigan
Year of birth missing (living people)
American women documentary filmmakers